Sinigaglia is an alternative spelling of Senigallia, a comune and port town in Italy. It is also an Italian surname that may refer to
Davide Sinigaglia (born 1981), Italian association football player
Giuseppe Sinigaglia (1884–1916), Italian rower
Stadio Giuseppe Sinigaglia in Italy named after Giuseppe Sinigaglia
Leone Sinigaglia (1868–1944), Italian composer and mountaineer
Lucrezia Sinigaglia (born 1990), Italian sabre fencer
Marco Sinigaglia (born 1968), Italian former football midfielder
María Alicia Sinigaglia (born 1964), Argentinian fencer
Oscar Sinigaglia, Italian engineer and industrialist 
Riccardo Sinigaglia (born 1953), Italian architect and musician